Who Cares a Lot? The Greatest Videos is the VHS version of Faith No More greatest hits album Who Cares a Lot?. It contains almost all of the band's music videos (only "Ricochet" and "Another Body Murdered" are not included), a new live video ("This Guy's In Love With You"), and behind-the-scenes interviews and footage, most of which was taken from a previous video release, Video Croissant. It is the most complete Faith No More video release to date.

Track listing
All songs written by Faith No More, except where noted.
"Midlife Crisis"
"Epic"
"Falling to Pieces"
"Anne's Song"
"We Care a Lot"
"Surprise! You're Dead!"
"From Out of Nowhere"
"A Small Victory"
"Everything's Ruined"
"Caffeine" (Live on Hangin' with MTV)
"Easy" (Lionel Richie)
"Digging the Grave" (Mike Bordin, Billy Gould, Mike Patton)
"Evidence" (Bordin, Gould, Patton, Trey Spruance)
"Stripsearch" (Patton, Gould)
"Last Cup of Sorrow" (Patton, Bordin, Gould, Jon Hudson, Roddy Bottum)
"Ashes to Ashes"
"I Started a Joke" (Barry Gibb, Robin Gibb, Maurice Gibb)
"This Guy's in Love with You" (Burt Bacharach, Hal David) (Live on MTV Europe)

Critical reception 

Billboard's Catherine Applefeld Olson describes the release as a collection of "some of the band's most attention-grabbing, groundbreaking clips." She also praises the inclusion of miscellaneous content that "devotees of the band will savor […] like scraps of gold." Denise Sullivan of AllMusic mainly deplores the track listing order which puts the "worst" music videos "first". However she still notes some "bright spots" on the collection, such as the "uncharacteristically high-budget clip for 'A Small Victory.'"

Miscellaneous
"Stripsearch" and "This Guy's In Love With You" were not listed on the back cover or on the tape.

References

External links
 
 

Faith No More video albums
1999 compilation albums
Music video compilation albums